Browneopsis excelsa is a species of plant in the family Fabaceae. It is found in Colombia, Panama, and Peru. It is threatened by habitat loss.

References

Detarioideae
Trees of Colombia
Trees of Panama
Trees of Peru
Vulnerable plants
Taxonomy articles created by Polbot